Duane Adam Joyce (born May 5, 1965) is an American former professional ice hockey defenseman.  He played three games in the National Hockey League with the Dallas Stars in the 1993–94 NHL season. He was born in Pembroke, Massachusetts. As a youth, he played in the 1978 Quebec International Pee-Wee Hockey Tournament with the Hobomock minor ice hockey team from Pembroke.

References

External links

1965 births
Adirondack Red Wings players
American men's ice hockey defensemen
Carolina Monarchs players
Cincinnati Cyclones (IHL) players
Dallas Stars players
Detroit Vipers players
Fort Wayne Komets players
Ice hockey players from Massachusetts
Kalamazoo Wings (1974–2000) players
Kansas City Blades players
Living people
Muskegon Lumberjacks players
Orlando Solar Bears (IHL) players
People from Pembroke, Massachusetts
Sportspeople from Plymouth County, Massachusetts
Springfield Indians players
Undrafted National Hockey League players
Union Dutchmen ice hockey players
Virginia Lancers players